Hershell America (born 17 February 1994) is a South African cricketer. He made his first-class debut for South Western Districts in the 2017–18 Sunfoil 3-Day Cup on 15 February  2018. He made his List A debut for South Western Districts in the 2018–19 CSA Provincial One-Day Challenge on 28 October 2018. He made his Twenty20 debut on 24 September 2021, for South Western Districts in the 2021–22 CSA Provincial T20 Knock-Out tournament.

References

External links
 

1994 births
Living people
South African cricketers
South Western Districts cricketers